Jernej Koblar (born 30 September 1971, in Jesenice) is a Slovenian former alpine skier who competed in the 1994 Winter Olympics, 1998 Winter Olympics, and 2002 Winter Olympics.

He is the husband of the former biathlete Andreja Koblar.

External links
 sports-reference.com

1971 births
Living people
Slovenian male alpine skiers
Olympic alpine skiers of Slovenia
Alpine skiers at the 1994 Winter Olympics
Alpine skiers at the 1998 Winter Olympics
Alpine skiers at the 2002 Winter Olympics
Sportspeople from Jesenice, Jesenice